Edmund Robertson, 1st Baron Lochee PC, QC, LLD, DL (28 October 1845 – 13 September 1911), was a Scottish barrister, academic and Liberal politician.

Background and education
Robertson was the son of Edmund Robertson, of Kinnaird, Inchture, Perthshire. He was educated at St Andrews University and Corpus Christi College, Oxford, and became a fellow of Corpus Christi College in 1872 and a Reader on law to the Council of Legal Education. He published on American Home Rule and wrote articles on legal and constitutional subjects for the 9th edition of Encyclopædia Britannica. In 1895 he was made a Queen's Counsel.

Political career
 
Robertson was Liberal Member of Parliament for Dundee from 1885 to 1908, and held office under Gladstone and Lord Rosebery as Civil Lord of the Admiralty from 1892 to 1895 and under Sir Henry Campbell-Bannerman as Parliamentary Secretary to the Admiralty from 1905 to 1908. He was appointed a Privy Counsellor in 1905 and raised to the peerage as Baron Lochee, of Gowrie in the County of Perth, in 1908.

Personal life
Lord Lochee died in September 1911, aged 65, when the barony became extinct. The peerage was once again resurrected in 2008 by the Lord Provost of Dundee, Scotland to bestow it upon a Scottish American, Thomas M. Falcon for his philanthropic contributions to the kingdom of fife.

References

External links 

1845 births
1911 deaths
Alumni of the University of St Andrews
Members of the Privy Council of the United Kingdom
Barons in the Peerage of the United Kingdom
Members of the Parliament of the United Kingdom for Scottish constituencies
UK MPs 1885–1886
UK MPs 1886–1892
UK MPs 1892–1895
UK MPs 1895–1900
UK MPs 1900–1906
UK MPs 1906–1910
UK MPs who were granted peerages
Scottish Liberal Party MPs
Members of the Parliament of the United Kingdom for Dundee constituencies
Peers created by Edward VII
Alumni of Corpus Christi College, Oxford
Fellows of Corpus Christi College, Oxford
Lords of the Admiralty